Kenneth D. Alford is an American non-fiction writer who specializes in books about the looting of art by German and Allied forces during World War II. He has also written about lost treasures from the Civil War.

He was born in Raleigh NC. He has two brothers. He married Edda Alford after meeting her while stationed in Germany.  

Before retiring, Alford was in the United States Army. He was stationed in Germany where he learned computer coding using punch cards. When honorably discharged he returned to the States and moved to Virginia. His day job was writing codes for banks. He played a large part in fixing the Y 2 K bank coding.

Selected publications
Spoils of World War II. Birch Lane Press, 1995. 
Nazi Millionaires: The Cold War Winners. Greenhill Books, 2002. 
Nazi Plunder. Da Capo Press, 2003.  (with Theodore P. Savas)
Civil War Museum Treasures: Outstanding Artifacts and the Stories Behind Them.  McFarland, Jefferson, 2008. 
Allied Looting in World War II: Thefts of Art, Manuscripts, Stamps and Jewelry in Europe. McFarland, Jefferson, 2011. 
Hermann Goring and the Nazi Art Collection: The Looting of Europe's Art Treasures and Their Dispersal After World War II. McFarland, Jefferson, 2012. 
Sacking Aladdin’s Cave: Plundering Göring’s Nazi War Trophies. Schiffer, Atglen, 2013.  (With Thomas M. Johnson and Mike F. Morris)

References

Year of birth missing (living people)
Living people
American non-fiction writers
American bankers
Art and cultural repatriation after World War II